Gaston Moore (born December 29, 1945) is a former political figure in New Brunswick, Canada. He represented Caraquet in the Legislative Assembly of New Brunswick from 2001 to 2003 as a Progressive Conservative member.

He was born in Moffet, Quebec, the son of Georges Moore and Eva Nadeau. A former police officer with the Service de police de la Ville de Montréal, Moore was also a fisherman for several years. He married Georgette Friolet with whom he has three daughters and three sons. Moore ran unsuccessfully for a seat in the provincial assembly in 1999. He was elected in a 2001 by-election held after Bernard Thériault ran for a seat in the House of Commons. He was defeated by a narrow margin in the 2003 general election. Moore was mayor of Bas-Caraquet from 1995 to 2001.

Notes

References 
 Canadian Parliamentary Guide, 2002, Kathryn O'Handley 

1945 births
Progressive Conservative Party of New Brunswick MLAs
Mayors of places in New Brunswick
Living people
21st-century Canadian politicians